Freiling's axiom of symmetry is a set-theoretic axiom proposed by Chris Freiling.  It is based on intuition of Stuart Davidson
but the mathematics behind it goes back to Wacław Sierpiński.

The axiom  states:

A theorem of Sierpiński says that under the assumptions of ZFC set theory,  is equivalent to the negation of the continuum hypothesis (CH). Sierpiński's theorem answered a question of Hugo Steinhaus and was proved long before the independence of CH had been established by
Kurt Gödel and Paul Cohen.

Freiling claims that probabilistic intuition strongly supports this proposition while others disagree.  There are several versions of the axiom, some of which are discussed below.

Freiling's argument

Fix a function f in A.  We will consider a thought experiment that involves throwing two darts at the unit interval.  We are not able to physically determine with infinite accuracy the actual values of the numbers x and y that are hit.  Likewise, the question of whether "y is in f(x)" cannot actually be physically computed. Nevertheless, if f really is a function, then this question is a meaningful one and will have a definite "yes" or "no" answer.

Now wait until after the first dart, x, is thrown and then assess the chances that the second dart y will be in f(x).  Since x is now fixed, f(x) is a fixed countable set and has Lebesgue measure zero. Therefore, this event, with x fixed, has probability zero.  Freiling now makes two generalizations:

 Since we can predict with virtual certainty that "y is not in f(x)" after the first dart is thrown, and since this prediction is valid no matter what the first dart does, we should be able to make this prediction before the first dart is thrown.  This is not to say that we still have a measurable event, rather it is an intuition about the nature of being predictable.
 Since "y is not in f(x)" is predictably true, by the symmetry of the order in which the darts were thrown (hence the name "axiom of symmetry") we should also be able to predict with virtual certainty that "x is not in f(y)".

The axiom  is now justified based on the principle that what will predictably happen every time this experiment is performed, should at the very least be possible.  Hence there should exist two real numbers x, y such that x is not in f(y) and y is not in f(x).

Relation to the (Generalised) Continuum Hypothesis
Fix  an infinite cardinal (e.g. ).

Claim: .

Proof:
Part I:

Suppose . Then there exists a bijection . Setting  defined via , it is easy to see that this demonstrates the failure of Freiling's axiom.

Part II:

Suppose that Freiling's axiom fails. This relation is total and every point has  many predecessors. Define now a strictly increasing chain  as follows: at each stage choose .
So  which is union of  many sets each of size . Hence . 

Note that  so we can easily rearrange things to obtain that  the above-mentioned form of Freiling's axiom.

The above can be made more precise: . This shows (together with the fact that the continuum hypothesis is independent of choice) a precise way in which the (generalised) continuum hypothesis is an extension of the axiom of choice.

Objections to Freiling's argument

Freiling's argument is not widely accepted because of the following two problems with it (which Freiling was well aware of and discussed in his paper).

 The naive probabilistic intuition used by Freiling tacitly assumes that there is a well-behaved way to associate a probability to any subset of the reals.  But the mathematical formalization of the notion of probability uses the notion of measure, yet the axiom of choice implies the existence of non-measurable subsets, even of the unit interval.  Some examples of this are the  Banach–Tarski paradox and the existence of Vitali sets.
A minor variation of his argument gives a contradiction with the axiom of choice  whether or not one accepts the continuum hypothesis, if one replaces countable additivity of probability by additivity for cardinals less than the continuum. (Freiling used a similar argument to claim that Martin's axiom is false.) It is not clear why Freiling's intuition should be any less applicable in this instance, if it applies at all.  So Freiling's argument seems to be more an argument against the possibility of well ordering the reals than against the continuum hypothesis.

Connection to graph theory
Using the fact that in ZFC, we have  (see above), it is not hard to see that the failure of the axiom of symmetry — and thus the success of  — is equivalent to the following combinatorial principle for graphs:

 The complete graph on  can be so directed, that every node leads to at most -many nodes.

 The complete graph on the unit circle can be so directed, that every node leads to at most countably-many nodes.

Thus in the context of ZFC, the failure of a Freiling axiom is equivalent to the existence of a specific kind of choice function.

References

Axioms of set theory
Thought experiments